The Indian village of Shendgaon is located in the taluka of Anjangaon which is in the district of Amravati in the state of Maharashtra. It is part of the Vidarbha region. Shendgaon is surrounded by Achalpur Taluka in the east, Daryapur Taluka in the south, Chikhaldara Taluka in the north, and Akot Taluka in the west. Marathi is the local language, but Hindi and English are commonly used. It is known as the birthplace of Saint Gadge Maharaj, a peripatetic teacher and social reformer, who recently had a commemorative bust unveiled in his honor. The state government of Maharashtra also runs a village cleanliness program named after him, and the University of Amravati was renamed as Sant Gadge Baba University.

Places of interest 
Sant Gadge Maharaj Mandir
Chikhaldara Wildlife Sanctuary- 30 km
Melghat Tiger Reserve- 35 km
Washim- 133 km
Burhanpur- 140 km
Sevagram- 158 km

Notable people
Gadge Maharaj

References

Amravati district